El Forn is a village in Andorra, Europe, located in the parish of Canillo.

Populated places in Andorra
Canillo